White Earth River may be either of two American rivers:

White Earth River (Minnesota)
White Earth River (North Dakota)